Lakshmipuram is mainly a residential locality in the northern part of the metropolitan city of Chennai, Tamil Nadu state, India.

Location
Lakshmipuram is located near Retteri junction, Kolathur, Chennai.
There is a vegetable market and also a fish market is available near Retteri junction.

Neighborhoods
Vinayagapuram
Surapet
Puthagaram
Senthil Nagar
Kolathur
Puzhal
Kathirvedu

Sub-neighborhoods
Kalpalayam
Thirumaal Nagar
Padmaavathi Nagar
Saarathy Nagar
Singaaravelavan Nagar
Saptagiri Nagar
Sakthi Nagar
Venkateshwaraa Nagar

Hospitals
Sri Kumaran Hospital
Maya Nursing Home

Surroundings

Neighbourhoods in Chennai